Ixodes cornuatus, commonly known as the Tasmanian paralysis tick, is one of about 75 species of Australian tick fauna. It is found across Tasmania and Victoria. It has been responsible for several cases of envenomation in humans and the death of one cat.

Ixodes cornuatus has been implicated in the envenomation of cats.

Ixodes cornuatus is difficult to distinguish from I. holocyclus. The ranges of the two species overlap in Eastern Victoria.

References

cornuatus
Arachnids of Australia
Animals described in 1960